Richard Riordan could refer to: 

Richard Riordan (born 1930), American businessman and 39th mayor of Los Angeles, California
Rick Riordan (born 1964), American author
Richard Riordan (Australian politician) (born 1972), member of the Victorian Legislative Assembly for Polwarth